Avittam Thirunaal Aarogya Sriman is a 1995 Malayalam film directed by Viji Thampi.

Plot

Avittam Thirunal Achutha Kuruppu (Jagathy Sreekumar) was a cheif commander of the Maharaja's  Nair Kshatriya army of the Princely State of Travancore. Now as an elderly man he stays with his different children and extended family. His presence in this families is not well-taken. His nosy nature and gluttony irritates his family. His family members try to avoid him, not wanting to take care of the irksome elderly man. Prabhakaran, his brother's son sees this and isn't able to agree with the families lack of love. He makes up a story that Achutha Kuruppu owns somewhat fifty-acre rubber estate from the Royal family. As the news arrives, the family's attitudes reverse's and all the fun begins.

Cast
 Jagathy Sreekumar as Avittam Thirunal Achutha Kuruppu a.k.a. Valiya Padathalavan
 Balachandra Menon as Prabhakaran
 Shanthi Krishna as Hemalatha
 Jagadish as Sahadevan
 Viji Thampi as Arumukham Thampi
 K.P.A.C.Lalitha as Devayani
 Indrans as Mangalan Mankombu
 Kalpana as Kousalya
 Meena
 Janardanan as Phalgunan Kuruppu
 Krishnan Kutty Nair as K.K. Kizhakkedam
 Philomina
 Sudheesh as Nakulan
 Usha as Jalaja Kumari
Shilpa Punnoose as Prabhakaran's daughter

References

External links
 IMDB Page

1990s Malayalam-language films
1995 films
Indian family films
Indian comedy films
Films shot in Thiruvananthapuram
Films shot in Kollam
Films shot in Alappuzha
Films directed by Padmarajan
Films directed by Viji Thampi